Alexandre Georges (25 February 1850 – 18 January 1938) was a French organist and composer.

Life 
Born in Arras, Georges studied at the local school where he became a teacher of harmony, as well as at the École Niedermeyer de Paris, directed by Gustave Lefèvre, and in which he also became a teacher. He held various positions as organist in Parisian churches, in Sainte-Clotilde and Saint-Vincent de Paul from 1899. He was a highly sought-after organ teacher and as a composer he was very interested in the Opera. Georges owes his fame to two cycles of melodies he wrote: Les chansons de Miarka (1888, on poems by Jean Richepin) and Les chansons de Leïlah (1899, after "Diwân", Persian poem by Émile Mariotte).

Georges died in Paris at age 87 (18 January 1938).

Works 
Operas
 Daphnis et Chloé (1883)
 Le Printemps (1888)
 Charlotte Corday (6 March 1901)
 Miarka (Opéra-Comique: 7 November 1905). Undoubtedly his greatest opera; repeated and reduced to 3 acts for the Opera (1925). The audience is seduced by the strange melancholy of this score.
 Pulcinella (1910)
 Sanga y sol (Nice, 23 February 1912)
 Le Printemps (1923)
 not represented; Le Violon de Krespel; Lycoenium; Fanny; Elssler; La Maison du Péché; Le Baz valan'n; Aucassin et Nicolette; Rivnah
 Lyrical scenes: Balthazar; Poème d'Amour (1892); Myrrha; Peyroulou; Sapho; 
 Tarass Boulba and le Vengeur
 stage music for Le Nouveau Monde, drama by Auguste Villiers de l'Isle-Adam performed at the Théâtre des Nations (1883); Alceste (1891); Axël (1894); Adonis (1910); La Marseillaise (1914)
Vocal and choral music
 Don Juan et Haïdée, cantata (1877)
 Notre-Dame de Lourdes, oratorio (1900)
 La Passion, oratorio (1902)
 Messe O Salutaris
 Trois Motets
 Chemin de Croix, oratorio
 Femmes grecques for mezzo, choir and orchestra (1915)
 Ode à la Paix universelle
 De Profundis (1925)
 Messe de Requiem (1925)
 Messe à la gloire de Notre-Dame des Flots (1926)
 Les chansons de Leïlah (1899)
 Chansons champenoises à la manière de Geneviève Dévignes
Music for orchestra
 Leïlah; La Naissance de Vénus and Paradis Perdu, symphonic poems
 Les chansons de Miarka, various pieces
 Monde religieux; Monde tragique; Monde passionnel, préludes
Chamber music
 A la Kasbah! for flute and piano
 Kosaks for violin and clarinet
 Trio de l'ut dièse for piano, violin and cello
 pieces for piano and organ

Sources

References

External links 
 
 Biography
 18 janvier 1938: décès du compositeur Alexandre Georges 
 Alexandre Georges: Miarka, L'hymne au soleil (YouTube)

1850 births
1938 deaths
People from Arras
French Romantic composers
French opera composers
French classical organists
French male organists
French music educators
19th-century French composers
20th-century French composers
20th-century French male musicians
19th-century French male musicians
Male classical organists